Pazhoor Perumthrikkovil is a temple of Shiva of Hindu tradition located in the town of Piravom, Ernakulam district, Kerala, India.

Type 
It is Sandhara type temple with cardinal doors on Four sides. The plinth and the wall together are of granite stone work and the rest of timber and sheet roof in circular vimana. Dwarapalakas are made of wood. Main deity Lord Shiva is facing east. Square ardhamandapa contains beautiful wooden carvings on the ceiling. Pranala is a typical ornate Kerala type with standing Yaksha bearing at its tip. It has some of the notable examples of old workmanship in wood, illustrating various scenes from puranas and figures from Bhagavata Purana, Ramayana, and Mahabharata. The temple can be dated to 12th century AD.

Considering the structural and mural importance, the temple was declared as protected monument by Kerala State Archaeology Department in 1994.

Archeological details 

Source - Archeological data from government

See also
 Pazhoor Padippura

References

Hindu temples in Ernakulam district
108 Shiva Temples